The Marlin Levermatic was a family of lever-action rifles created by Marlin Firearms in the 1955.  The Levermatic differed from the traditional lever-action rifles, such as the Marlin 39A, in that it employed a cam-and-roller system giving it an extremely smooth and short lever motion to reload a new cartridge.

This cam-and-roller system was originally invented by Kessler Arms Company for their "Lever-Matic" shotgun.  Following Kessler's dissolution, Marlin licensed the idea and began producing rifles using a similar design.

The Marlin Model 56 was made between 1955 and 1964. There are no records to give a more exact date.

The firearm may not have a serial or production number as long guns were not required to have a serial numbers prior to the 1968 Gun Control Act, which went into effect January 1, 1969. Therefore, many manufacturers did not serialize their economy line of products.

Various internet sources and firearms forums relate the following information for dating the initial production of the Model 56:

early 1955:  steel receiver, 24" barrel with low serial numbers
late 1955:  steel receiver, 22" barrel without serial numbers
1956 to end of production:  aluminum receiver, 22" barrel without serial numbers.

Marlin is known to have produced 7, 10 and 12 round magazines for the Model 56.

Another attribute to the Model 56's accuracy was the patented Marlin Microgroove Barrel®. This barrel differed from previous traditional rifled barrels.

This revolutionary rifling led to common reports of this rifle producing 1" groups at 100 yards (now commonly called 1 minute groups, or minute of angle groups, with 1" at 100 yards equaling 1 minute of angle) or even less (which is known as sub minute of angle grouping.)
one
This achievement is now much more commonplace with advancements in metallurgy in regards to cutting tools, and Computer Numerical Controlled machining. But in the 1950s; this was an outstanding achievement, especially for the .22 Long Rifle rimfire cartridge. Also contributing to its accuracy was the one-piece stock with the rifle action bedded.

Models
The Levermatic system was used in the following rifle models:

Marlin 56: .22 LR, Box magazine (1955–1964)
Sears 46c (Marlin 56): .22 Long Rifle, 7 round Box magazine (1956)
Marlin 57:  .22 LR, Tubular magazine (1959–1965)
 J. C. Higgins 44 DL (Marlin 57): .22 Long Rifle, Tubular magazine
 Western Auto Revelation model 115 (Marlin 57): .22 Long Rifle, Magazine (firearms)
Marlin 57M:  .22 Winchester Magnum Rimfire, Tubular magazine (1959–1969)
J. C. Higgins 44 DLM (Marlin 57m): .22 Winchester Magnum Rimfire, Tubular magazine
Marlin 62:  .256 Winchester Magnum and .30 Carbine, 4 round Box magazine(1963–1969)

Planned models
Marlin had also planned to produce the Levermatic in .357 Magnum and .22 Remington Jet offered in the Marlin model 62. Both cartridges are related to the .256 Magnum which shared the same .357 Magnum parent case, but these options never materialized.

References

Sources
Fryxell, Glen E. Marlin's Microgroove Barrels
Malloy, John.  Marlin’s Levermatic Rifle Line Offered Untraditional Design.  New Gun Week, Vol. 40 Issue 1811 - Jan. 1. 2005.

Lever-action rifles
Marlin Firearms Company firearms
Rifles of the United States
.22 LR rifles